Dagshai, also known as Daagh-e-Shahi, is one of the oldest cantonment towns in the Solan district of Himachal Pradesh, India.  It is situated on top of a 5,689-foot (1,734-m) high hillock that stands sphinx-like astride the Kalka-Shimla Highway at a point about 11 km from Solan. It was founded in 1847 by the East India Company by securing free of cost five villages from Maharaja of Patiala aka Bhupinder Singh of Patiala. The names of these villages were Dabbi, Badhtiala, Chunawad, Jawag and Dagshai. The new cantonment was named after the last named village, as it was the largest and most strategically located. The name Dagshai, according to a popular local legend was derived from Daagh-e-Shahi. During the Moghul times a Daagh-e-Shahi (royal mark) was put on the forehead of the criminals and sent packing to the then Dagshai village.

Overview 

Built by the British as a sanatorium for tuberculosis patients, it has a British era graveyard overlooking a valley. It is on the same height as Lawrence School Sanawar near Kasauli, and is a short drive from Dharampur on the Chandigarh Shimla highway. It is some 65 kilometers from Chandigarh.  Unlike Kasauli it is to the right of the highway while driving towards Shimla. There are two roads up, both steep. And after snow, snow chains are a must to drive up to Dagshai or getting down from it. 
There is an army unit stationed there, a residential only Army Public School, Dagshai and a private school called Dagshai Public School.

There is a very small civilian town, and the two schools take up most of this hilltop station. There are no hotels in Dagshai, but the place has a lot of picnic spots with grand views. From some spots one can see the entire Panchkula and Chandigarh lights at night. Also, one is able to see Timber Trail Heights and Timber Trail Resorts, Parwanoo.

There is a railway station on the Kalka Simla line at Kumar Hatti, from where Dagshai is about 1.5 kilometers uphill.
The next towns in the direction towards Simla are Barog and Solan. Solan is some 11 km from Kumar Hatti by road, and Dagshai is some 3 km from Kumar Hatti. From Kumar Hatti there is also a road to Sarahan and Nahan.

Dagshai Central Jail & Jail Museum 
The Dagshai Central Jail was built in 1849. It is now a museum.

Irish soldiers' mutiny, 1920

Following a mutiny by Irish soldiers in 1920, in support of the independence struggle then unfolding in Ireland, dozens of mutineers were incarcerated at Dagshai Prison. 

On 2 November 1920, mutineer leader James Daly, a 21-year-old private, was executed by firing squad in the prison courtyard, the last British soldier ever executed for mutiny. His body remained at the Dagshai graveyard until 1970, when his remains were repatriated to Ireland and given a funeral with full military honours.

Geography

Demographics
 India census, Dagshai had a population of 2751. Males constitute 62% of the population and females 38%. Dagshai has an average literacy rate of 82%, higher than the national average of 59.5%: male literacy is 88% and, female literacy is 73%. In Dagshai, 11% of the population is under 6 years of age.

Religion (2011)

Residential schools 
 Army Public School, Dagshai (ranked 9th among top boarding schools)
 Dagshai Public School (a residential school, started way back in 1957, and affiliated with ICSE).
 Sarvahitkari Shiksha Niketan
 VC children primary school

References

Cities and towns in Solan district
Cantonments of India
Cantonments of British India
1847 establishments in British India